SuperScan is a free connect-based port scanning software designed to detect open TCP and UDP ports on a target computer, determine which services are running on those ports, and run queries such as whois, ping, ICMP traceroute, and Hostname lookups.

Superscan 4, which is a completely rewritten update to the other Superscan (version 3, released in 2000), features windows enumeration, which can list a variety of important information dealing with Microsoft Windows such as:
NetBIOS information
User and Group Accounts
Network shares
Trusted Domains
Services - which are either running or stopped

Superscan is a tool used by system administrators, crackers and script kiddies to evaluate a computer's security.  System administrators can use it to test for possible unauthorised open ports on their computer networks, whereas crackers use it to scan for insecure ports in order to gain illegal access to a system.

References

Port scanners
Windows network-related software